The Meizu MX6 is a smartphone designed and produced by the Chinese manufacturer Meizu, which runs on Flyme OS, Meizu's modified Android operating system. It is the company's latest model of the MX series, succeeding the Meizu MX5. It was unveiled on July 19, 2016 in Beijing.

History 
Initial rumors were released in January after AnTuTu benchmark results appeared online, stating that the upcoming device would feature a MediaTek Helio X20 System on a chip, 4 GB of RAM and a Full HD display.
In July 2016, official invitations for the launch event on July 19, 2016 in Beijing were sent out.

Pre-orders for the MX6 began on July 19, 2016 and 3.2 million devices have been pre-registered for sale during the first day.
Sales in mainland China began on July 30, 2016.

Connectivity
The MX6 has a USB-C port.

Reception
The MX6 received generally positive reviews. Forbes praised the device for its good value for money, high build quality due to its metal unibody frame and the gesture feature in Flyme OS, noting that “the Meizu MX6 is the best bargain on the market”.
Another review has stated that the rear camera represents a significant improvement in comparison to the previous generation.

See also
 Meizu
 Meizu MX5
 Comparison of smartphones

References

External links
 Official product page Meizu

Android (operating system) devices
Mobile phones introduced in 2016
Meizu smartphones
Mobile phones with 4K video recording
Discontinued smartphones